Hydrangea strigosa is a species of flowering plant in the family Hydrangeaceae. It is native to China.

References

External links
 Hydrangea strigosa at efloras.org.

strigosa
Flora of China